Kolskaya was a jack-up rig operating in the Russian Far East. It was built by Rauma-Repola in Pori, Finland in 1985 and was owned by the Russian company ArktikmorNeftegazRazvedka (AMNGR), a subsidiary of Zarubezhneft.

Kolskaya was an independent leg cantilever type jack-up rig.

Capsize and sinking
On December 18, 2011, the rig, which was under tow during a fierce storm, capsized and sank in the Sea of Okhotsk. It was being towed by the icebreaker Magadan and the tugboat Neftegaz-55 having just completed an exploration well for Gazprom off the Kamchatka Peninsula. In terms of operational safety, the towing operation's compliance with best practices was doubtful since the platform’s manufacturer explicitly stated that "towing is prohibited in the winter, in winter seasonal zones."

A search and rescue effort began as soon as the rig sank and was halted five days later on December 22. Of the 67 people known to have been aboard Kolskaya, 14 had been rescued and 36 more were listed as missing. Only 17 bodies had been recovered. With 53 declared missing or dead, it was the largest number of casualties in an accident the Russian oil sector has ever experienced.

References

1985 ships
2011 in Russia
Disasters in the Russian Far East
Jack-up rigs
Maritime incidents in 2011
Maritime incidents in Russia
Oil platform disasters
Shipwrecks in the Sea of Okhotsk
Shipwrecks of Russia
Oil spills in Russia